Silicon Gorge is a region in South West England in which several high-tech and research companies are based, specifically the triangle of Bristol, Swindon and Gloucester. It is ranked fifth of such areas in Europe, and is named after the Avon Gorge.

Cities

Bath
Bath is home to a number of high-tech companies ranging from fabless semiconductor designers to eCommerce retailers. Many companies have been started by ex-employees of companies such as Future Publishing and IPL, two long standing employers in the area.

Microelectronic companies in Bath
 PicoChip

Ventures
 Lovehoney uk sex-toy retailer.
 The Filter media recommendation service.
 Netcraft Internet Research and Security

Bristol
Bristol is part of the Silicon Gorge, along with Gloucester and Swindon and hosts a number of high-tech and creative industries including research group HP Labs and animation studio Aardman Animations. The cluster of high-tech electronics industries began when Fairchild Semiconductor located a design office in Bristol in 1972. Bristol also has the strongest digital media supply chain in England, outside London and has been pinpointed as a "hot spring" for innovation on the McKinsey/World Economic Forum innovation map.

Microelectronics companies in Bristol
 Blu Wireless
 Broadcom
 Cray Supercomputers
 Graphcore AI accelerators
 HP Labs
 Huawei
 Imagination Technologies
 Infineon
 Nordic Semiconductor
 Sondrel
 Qualcomm
 UltraSoC
 XMOS

Tech companies in Bristol
 Blackmagic Design
 Just Eat
 Open Bionics
 Zap Map

Business incubators

 Bristol Robotics Laboratory Hardware Incubator 
 SETsquared
 Spike Design

Support organisations
 Media Sandbox by Watershed Media Centre

Networks
 Bristol Media

Ventures
 Aardman Animations
 Dyson
 Gresham Technologies plc
IMDb
 Renishaw plc
 Viral Ad Network

Other cities
 Gloucester
 Swindon
Cities sometimes associated with the region: 
 Exeter 
 Southampton
 Plymouth

Academic Institutions
 University of Bristol
 University of the West of England
 University of Bath
 University of Exeter
 Bath Spa University

See also
 Silicon Fen
 Silicon Glen
 Silicon Valley
 M4 Corridor

References

High-technology business districts in the United Kingdom
Information technology places
Science and technology in Bristol
Science and technology in Gloucestershire
Science and technology in Wiltshire